The Madagascar dwarf gecko (Lygodactylus madagascariensis) is a species of gecko endemic to Madagascar.

References

Lygodactylus
Reptiles of Madagascar
Endemic fauna of Madagascar
Taxa named by Oskar Boettger
Reptiles described in 1881